Alok Achkar Peres Petrillo (born 26 August 1991) is a Brazilian musician, DJ, and record producer. He is known for his single "Hear Me Now". In 2021 and 2022, Alok was ranked the 4th best DJ in the world by DJ Mag, being the highest position occupied by a Brazilian.

Alok has become one of the most prominent icons in the Brazilian electronic scene, with honors and awards, such as "Best DJ in Brazil" by House Mag in 2014 and 2015, and being the only Brazilian in the top 25 in the world the following year by DJ Mag magazine. In 2017, he was elected by Forbes Brasil as one of the most influential people under the age of 30 in the country. 
In July 2019, he launched Controversia Records, a sublabel of Spinnin' Records.

Biography 
Petrillo was born in Goiânia, Brazil, the son of DJs' Swarup and Ekanta, who are also pioneers of psytrance in the country and creators of the Universo Paralello, electronic music festival in Bahia. 

His name came after his parents travelled to India, where they met with spiritual guru Osho, who indicated that the boy should be called Alok, which in the Sanskrit language means "light".

Career 
He began his career at the age of 12 along with his fraternal twin brother Bhaskar Petrillo. At age 19 he pursued a solo career, becoming one of the most prominent icons in the Brazilian electronic scene, with honors and awards, such as "Best DJ in Brazil" awarded by House Mag for two consecutive times (in the years 2014 and 2015) and the only Brazilian in the top 25 world DJ ranking by DJ Magazine in 2016.

At age 10 he began to learn to play, playing music with his fraternal twin brother Bhaskar. In 2004, he and his brother attended the rehearsal studio of their father Swarup's band, playing drums. According to Ekanta, they were interested in how the remixes were made and with the help of DJ's Zumbi and Pedrão, family friends, they taught the brothers to mix the songs, and each one learned a specialty, one on the keyboard and the other on the guitar. Shortly thereafter, Dick Trevor installed the Logic Pro music editing program on Swarup's computer, bringing the brothers closer to producing music.

He and his brother attended the presentations that their parents made at parties PSY trance, soon creating the project Logica.

Petrillo is also the founder of UP Club Records, a record label specializing in discovering new inborn talent in electronic music.

In November 2019, Alok Petrillo became a character of Garena Free Fire under his name Alok and Song released Vale Vale with Zafrir. in August 2021, according to in-game info from Garena Free Fire Alok is the most used character in game. Petrillo along with Dimitri Vegas & Like Mike & KSHMR released Collaboration song for Free Fire's 4th anniversary.

Discography

Compilation albums

Extended plays

Singles

As lead artist

As featured artist

Remixes 
2019: Alok and Harrison — "Tell Me Why" (VIP Mix)
2020: Dua Lipa — "Physical" (Alok Remix)
2020: The Rolling Stones — "Living in a Ghost Town" (Alok Remix)
2021: Masked Wolf — "Astronaut in the Ocean" (Alok Remix)
2021: Slander featuring Dylan Matthew — "Love Is Gone" (Alok Remix)
2021: Joel Corry and Jax Jones — "Out Out" (featuring Charli XCX and Saweetie) (Alok Remix)

Awards

DJ Magazine Top 100 DJs

Notes

References

External links 
 

1991 births
Brazilian dance musicians
Brazilian DJs
Brazilian record producers
Electro house musicians
Living people
Remixers
Streamy Award winners
Brazilian Internet celebrities
Spinnin' Records artists
People from Goiânia
Electronic dance music DJs